Patrick John Dunleavy (born 21 June 1952), is Emeritus Professor of Political Science and Public Policy within the Government Department of  the London School of Economics (LSE).  He was also Co-Director of Democratic Audit and Chair of the LSE Public Policy Group. In addition Dunleavy is an ANZSOG Institute for Governance Centenary Chair at the University of Canberra, Australia.

As an undergraduate Patrick Dunleavy studied Philosophy, Politics and Economics at Corpus Christi College, Oxford, graduating in 1973. He moved to Nuffield College, Oxford to work on his doctoral thesis which was published in 1981 as The Politics of Mass Housing in Britain, 1945-75: Study of Corporate Power and Professional Influence in the Welfare State.

Dunleavy is a prominent political theorist specialising in the fields of public policy and government. His research has focused on the concepts of sectors and sectoral conflicts, rational choice theories of politics, the bureau-shaping model of bureaucracy, and the claimed contemporary public management paradigm of digital era governance.  Dunleavy is a frequent blogger on the LSE's British Politics and Policy site and has had an active Twitter account since 2010 commentating predominately on British politics. He is also former joint editor-in-chief of the academic journal Global Policy.

Dunleavy is also the author of advice texts for humanities and social sciences students, most notably his book Authoring a PhD: How to plan, draft, write and finish a doctoral dissertation or thesis (2003).

In June 2014 Dunleavy examined how costly it would be to set up an independent Scottish state as lead author of the report Transitioning to a New Scottish State commissioned by The Sunday Post. Both the Yes and No camps in the independence debate claimed the report to differing extents validated their own arguments and figures. Dunleavy has since declared publicly that the Scottish Treasury "badly misrepresents" his research.

Editorships of journals 

 Global Policy

Selected publications
Books
 
 
 
 
 
 
 

Chapters in books
 

Journal articles

References

External links
Professor Patrick Dunleavy's profile page on LSE website
Global Policy
List of publications
LSE Public Policy Group 
Democratic Audit UK

1952 births
Living people
Academics of the University of London
British political scientists
Academics of the London School of Economics
Public administration scholars